Newman Township may refer to:

 Newman Township, Douglas County, Illinois
 Newman Township, Saunders County, Nebraska
 Newman Township, Ward County, North Dakota, in Ward County, North Dakota

Township name disambiguation pages